Coast to Kosciuszko (C2K) is a  ultramarathon race run each December in New South Wales, Australia.

Results

 The 'inclement weather course' does not include the (approximately 18 km) return trip from Charlotte Pass to the summit.

External links

Course Map: http://www.gmap-pedometer.com/?r=1474779

Ultramarathons
Athletics competitions in Australia
Recurring sporting events established in 2004
2004 establishments in Australia